"Ai No Corrida" (lit. Love Race) is a song by the English singer and multi-instrumentalist Chaz Jankel, written by Jankel and Kenny Young. The title is based on the Japanese title of the erotic film In the Realm of the Senses. It was first recorded in 1980 and featured on Chaz Jankel's debut album Chas Jankel for A&M Records. 

Quincy Jones's 1981 recording of the song was a top 30 hit in the United States, and won the Grammy Award for Best Arrangement, Instrumental and Vocals in 1982.

Original version and name origin
"Ai No Corrida" is a song written by Chaz Jankel and Kenny Young, first recorded in 1980 and featured on Jankel's self-titled debut album for A&M Records.  is the Japanese word for "love", while Corrida is the Portuguese word for "race".

Charts

Cover versions

Quincy Jones version

The song was covered by Quincy Jones in 1981 on his album The Dude, with vocals by Dune (a.k.a. Charles May) and Patti Austin. Jones's version peaked at number 28 on the U.S. Billboard Hot 100 and number 10 on the R&B chart. In the UK, it peaked at number 14 in May 1981.

Awards
Jerry Hey and Jones received the 1982 Grammy Award for Best Instrumental Arrangement Accompanying Vocalist(s) for their recording of this song.

Chart performance

Spanish version
Jones also recorded a Spanish-language version for the 2006 charity album Rhythms del mundo, with vocals by Vania Borges.

Uniting Nations version

British dance music act Uniting Nations released the song as their third single from the band album One World after the success of "Out of Touch" and "You and Me".

The song featured the vocals of Laura More of Eric Prydz and "Call On Me" fame. The backing vocals are from Steve M. Smith and Yolanda Quartey. The song was produced by Essex Buddha, with Hal Ritson as sample replay producer, and came in 12-inch vinyl, in enhanced CD (which included the video).

Track listings
12-inch single
A. Ai No Corrida (Sharp Boys dub) (7:44)
B. Ai No Corrida (Uniting Nations extended mix) (6:02)

CD single
 "Ai No Corrida" (Uniting Nations radio edit) (2:49)
 "Ai No Corrida" (original radio edit) (3:10)
 "Ai No Corrida" (Uniting Nations extended mix) (6:01)
 "Ai No Corrida" (Sharp Boys club mix) (7:43)
 "Ai No Corrida" (video)

Charts

Japanese version
In Japan, 1981, a Japanese-language version was released by RVC, performed by Japanese unit BIG BANG (Yoshifumi Oba, Yoshihiko Shiraishi, Katsumi Takeichi, Shunji Inoue), produced by Koichi Fujita.

References

External links
Ai No Corrida original version by Chaz Jankel on A&M Records

Ai No Corrida live medley performed at Montreax in 2008 for Quincy Jones' 75th birthday
Ai No Korida 2005 music video by Uniting Nations

1980 songs
1981 singles
Chaz Jankel songs
Quincy Jones songs
2005 singles
Uniting Nations songs
Songs written by Chaz Jankel
Songs written by Kenny Young
Grammy Award for Best Instrumental Arrangement Accompanying Vocalist(s)
Cultural depictions of Sada Abe
A&M Records singles